The Nissena Cup (Coppa Nissena in Italian) is an automobile competition that takes place every year in Sicily. It is a hillclimbing race and is a valid test for the Italian Hillclimb Championship (CIVM) and the Mountain Trophy. It is organized by the Automobile Club d'Italia.

The length of the route is 4904 meters and the average gradient is 4.19%.

History

The date of the first Nissena Cup dates back to May 24, 1922, on the occasion of the inauguration of the war memorial of the Great War, in Viale Regina Margherita in Caltanissetta. The route of the time was 166.6 km long, which would be covered in two turns, starting with via Sant'Anna and reaching Imera, passing through Capodarso and Castrogiovanni (today Enna). The first edition was won by Luigi López, with an Itala.

The Nissena Cup for the outbreak of World War II in the first place, but also for organizational reasons, disappears from the calendar for 25 years.
The return was only in 1949, with a new formula: hillclimbing and the route is shortened to only 12 km.
Since 1968, born the prototype era.

Winners 

The following table shows the winners of the event:

External links 
 Automobile Club d'Italia di Caltanissetta

See also 
 Catania-Etna (Hill Climb)
 Giarre-Montesalice-Milo (Hill Climb)
 Monti Iblei Cup (Hill Climb)

References 

Hillclimbs
Auto races in Italy
Motorsport venues in Italy